International Conventional Centre, Pune is the largest composite trade and convention centre in South Asia. This is located on Senapati Bapat Road (S B Road) in Pune in Maharashtra state in India. This is also called as ICC trade towers locally. This consist of:
 ICC trade tower.
 ICC tech park.
 Pune Marriott Hotel and Convention Centre.

The trade tower measuring 480,000 sq. ft. area comprising for offices. The Marriott Hotel and Convention Centre have 418 rooms. The S. L. Kirloskar convention measures 40,000 sq. ft. area and is used for meeting and exhibition which can accommodate up to 1800 people and is located in Pune Marriott Hotel and Convention Centre. The ICC Mall measures about 665,500 sq. ft. and consist of mall, office space, multiplex and family entertainment.

Buildings inside International Convention centre, Pune

ICC Trade Tower
This tower is register as Software Technology Park of India. The tower is made up of office blocks and showrooms. The total area of this is 475,000 sq. ft. and floor plate with 60,000 sq. ft. This has multi-level parking with two basements which can accommodate more than 500 cars.

ICC Tech Park
This has two office blocks with 150,000 sq. ft. and 170,000 sq. ft. respectively. Each office has 20,000 sq. ft. floor plate.

Pune Marriott Hotel and Convention Centre
This consist of open air exhibition ground, an art gallery, function rooms and auditoriums. This has 418 rooms and 40,000 sq. ft. meeting and exhibition space to accommodate 1800 people. There are 12 meeting rooms which accommodate 1800 people. The ICC Mall is located in this building.

References

External links
 International Convention Centre, Pune (Official site)

Buildings and structures in Pune
Convention centres in India
Economy of Pune
2010 establishments in Maharashtra
Buildings and structures completed in 2010